Caroma (Caroma Dorf) is an Australian designer and distributor of bathroom products. Caroma was established in 1941 by Hungarian-born Charles Rothauser, and since closing its last factory in 2017 now sources all products from third-party overseas manufacturers. Caroma is a subsidiary of GWA International Limited, and introduced the world's first two-button dual flush toilet system. The company self-distributes within Australia and abroad sells through distributors such as Sustainable Solutions International in North America and Sanlamere in the United Kingdom.

The company was established in 1941 with a factory at Norwood, an inner eastern suburb of Adelaide. The company announced its intention to close down manufacturing in Australia on 8 October 2014. The factory at Wetherill Park in Sydney closed in 2014. It finally closed the Norwood factory on 24 February 2017. Manufacture now occurs in Malaysia, China and Europe.

Caroma Dorf companies 

The Caroma Dorf group of companies offers a range of bathroom, kitchen and laundry products from a number of brands. 
 Fowler – range of toilets and basins for bathrooms.
 Dorf – Offers a range of products for bathrooms, kitchens and laundries.
 Clark – Clark has a range of kitchen sinks.
 Epure – Epure is Clark's expensive range which offers a variety of kitchen sinks.
 Radiant – products for kitchen and laundries.
 Irwell – A range of tapware products.
 Stylus – Best known for its baths and spas, Stylus also offers a range of cheap toilets, basins, mixers, taps, showers and bathroom accessories.
 Dux Hot Water

Innovations 

 The first in the world to introduce the two-button dual flush system in 1982
 The first in the world to introduce the 6/3L dual flush cistern
 The first to introduce the 4.5/3L dual flush cistern through Smartflush technology
 The first company to gain a WELS 5 Star rating for toilet suites
 The first company to achieve an Australian WELS 6 Star rating for urinals

Awards 

 Australian Design Award for Excellence in Australian Design in the Housing & Building category (2009) – Caroma Invisi Series II Toilet Suite
 Australian Design Awards for Excellence in Sustainable Design (2007) -Caroma H2Zero Cube Urinal
 Australian Design Award for Excellence in Australian Design in the Housing and Building category (2005)- Smartflush Toilet Suite Range

References

Bathroom fixture companies
Kitchenware brands
Manufacturing companies of Australia
Design companies established in 1941
Manufacturing companies established in 1941
Australian companies established in 1941
Australian brands